McLean Homes was a major British housebuilding business. It was bought by a major construction company, Tarmac, in 1972 and the brand ceased to be used in 1996.

History

The business was formed in 1920 by John McLean and incorporated in 1932.  From the early 1950s the Company moved progressively into private housebuilding in the west midlands. It also developed similar homes in Dublin in the Republic of Ireland at the same time. It was the second generation Geoffrey McLean who led the company's post-war growth. He was notable for the modern application of marketing methods, including the part exchange of customers' existing house, careful estate layouts and timber-framed production.

Growth after the flotation was disappointing and in 1969 the company acquired Midland & General Developments, then controlled by one-time estate agent Eric Pountain. In that year there were further losses on local authority housing contracts and McLean profits fell below their flotation level. Following a boardroom coup, Eric Pountain replaced Geoffrey McLean as managing director and the business was rationalised. Helped by a buoyant private housing market, housing sales reached the 1000 a year mark. At the end of 1972, McLean agreed to a bid from Tarmac which wanted to strengthen its own poorly performing housing division.

The combination of the two companies, still trading as McLean Homes, produced a 2,000 unit a year housebuilder, putting the enlarged business into the top ten.  Under Pountain's management, McLean steadily expanded its regional network and was building nearly 4,000 houses a year by the end of the 1970s by which time Pountain had progressed to become managing director of the whole Tarmac group, following another boardroom coup. Housing continued to expand and by 1987 McLean was the largest housebuilder in the country; sales in 1988 exceeded 12,000.

The recession that started in 1989 took its toll on Tarmac, which had continued to buy land even as the market was turning down. Provisions of over £130m were eventually made against the housing division. Pountain resigned as CEO in 1992 and the Tarmac group came under the control of its construction division managing director. The housing division was reduced in scope and in 1995 a decision was made to dispose of the group's housing interests. The result was an asset swap with Wimpey whereby Wimpey acquired Tarmac's housing interests in return for its construction and quarrying divisions.

References

Housebuilding companies of the United Kingdom
British companies established in 1934
Manufacturing companies established in 1934
1934 establishments in England